3 Mai is the third studio album by South Korean singer Psy, released on September 19, 2002. It contains 15 songs, including the two singles "Champion" and "Paradise". By February 2003, the album sold over 135,000 copies in South Korea.

Background and release 
The third album was released in September 2002 with a launch on an internet music site. The title of the album "3 mai" means cheap. Unlike his previous albums, the lyrics were less explicit. Regarding the change, Psy commented that "3mai was intended as a project for taking a break, however, it should not be intended as a change of my personality." Lee Sun-hee, Kim Wan-sun, Park mi kyung, and Lee Jae-hoon of Cool featured in the album as vocals, as well as Park Jae-Eun, Psy's older sister.

Composition 
The song "Royal Family" aims to criticize Korean marriage agencies which arrange meetings based on their academic credentials and wealth. The song "Peacefully" is about his longing for his grandfather who died on the third day of Psy's arrest for marijuana charges. The song "Celebrities (빤빠라)" aims to criticize politicians using celebrity scandals during elections to gain more votes. The timely release, during Seoul's enthusiasm over the 2002 FIFA World Cup, and a title track "Champion" with its "crowd-pumping vibe" which became "massively popular", confirmed his place in the Korean music world and on the K-pop scene. 

The title song "Champion" was also inspired by Korean street cheering during the 2002 World Cup. The song's lyrics include the word "ganggangsullae", the name of a traditional Korean folk dance that brings people together in a large circle to dance and play; with the message that "true champions are the ones who know how to have fun." Psy said about the song, "During the World Cup, I saw Korean people really loosen up to just have fun", and "I wanted to encourage that same carefree enjoyment, even without the soccer".

Critical reception
Paul Lester of The Guardian called "Champion" a "thrashy disco" which heavily samples Axel F by Harold Faltermeyer". Jeff Benjamin of Billboard said, "'Champion' is a funky dance track that uses video game-like synthesizers years before the EDM explosion. With self-empowering lyrics and the repeated title word in the chorus, the song doubled as an anthem for South Korea when they hosted the World Cup in Seoul that year."

Legacy 
Psy continued to perform "Champion" again and again throughout his career. At Park Geun-hye's 2013 Presidential Inauguration for a televised performance in front of the National Assembly he wore a black tuxedo with a bow tie and sunglasses and opened with "Champion", followed by "Gangnam Style". In June 2014, he performed the song again, among eight, at a Seoul street concert of nearly 30,000, during celebrations for the 2014 FIFA World Cup, when Korea tied Russia in the first round. He said, "The impassioned cheering of citizens inspired me to write 'Champion.' It's also a song that helped me continue my music career, which would have ended after a short run [if it weren't for 'Champion']. So even though 'Gangnam Style' was such a success, it can't be as dear to me as 'Champion,'" he said.' He expressed his fondness for the song, saying it would always "hold a special place" in his heart, and recounted that ten years later he was putting a lot of effort into making his music that successful again.

A different complaint
Although its title track "Champion" was received well by Korean soccer fans, a different complaint was raised for this album, by expat English teachers. At the time of its release and later with a new audience created by 2012's "Gangnam Style", English speaking fans were offended by the repeated use of the word "ni-ga" or ("you" in Korean), in the lyrics ("you are the champion"), which they heard as the N-word. After clarification, many thought it an appropriate jab at convention, as Psy had studied in America and spoke English.

Track listing

Charts and sales

Monthly charts

Sales

References

2002 albums
Korean-language albums
Psy albums